Marble River Provincial Park is a provincial park in British Columbia, Canada. The park is located on northern Vancouver Island. The park protects an eagle nesting habitat near Quatsino Narrows in Quatsino Sound, a steelhead fishery, and an extensive waterfowl habitat. A -long biking or walking trail is available, as well as opportunities for wildlife viewing.

References 

 British Columbia Ministry of the Environment - Marble River Provincial Park. Accessed April 8, 2007.

Provincial parks of British Columbia
Northern Vancouver Island
Year of establishment missing